John Greenhalgh may refer to:
John Greenhalgh (footballer) (1898–1987), English footballer with Burnley and Accrington Stanley
John Greenhalgh (governor) (died 1651), governor of the Isle of Man
Jack Greenhalgh (trade unionist), British trade union leader

See also
Jack Greenhalgh, American cinematographer